Within Colombia, the term Música popular ('popular music') is often used to refer to a folk music genre originated between the 1930s and 1940s in the Paisa Region, in the northwestern part of the country, influenced primarily by Mexican folk music, as well as Argentinian, Ecuadorian and Peruvian to a lesser degree.

History 

The genre started to develop between the 1930s and 1940s in the Paisa Region (comprising the modern-day departments of Antiochia, Caldas, Quindio and Rizarald), based on Mexican folk music genres such as corrido, huapango and ranchera, as well as on bolero, tango, pasillo and others, which were very popular among campesinos around that time.

The genre started to gain popularity between the late 1940s and the 1950s, when artists such as Oscar Agudelo or Luis Angel Ramirez started to take off. During that time, the genre was regarded as proper to Colombia's lower class.

During the late 20th century, the most well known genre's artists such as Dario Gomez, El Charrito Negro, Luis Alberto Posada, etc. were being listened all throughout the country's bars. However, the genre started to stall in the early 2000s, given the low number of well-known artists and the aging of the existing ones.

The genre saw a comeback between the late 2000s and the early 2010s, when new artists such as Pipe Bueno, Jhon Alex Castaño or Jason Jiménez started to appear. It is not exactly known why this increase in popularity occurred. When interviewed by El Colombiano, senior manager of record label Codiscos Alvaro Picon said that Pipe Bueno played a huge roll in the process of the genre's repopularization. He also said that the popularity momentum created by Bueno was then kept by the introduction other new artists who brought the genre to listeners outside of its traditional bar niche. The softening of the lyrics of the genre's songs was also cited as a factor by Picon. He lastly said that additionally, a decline in the popularity of romantic vallenato coinciding with the revival of música popular boosted even more the rise in popularity of the last one.

References 

Latin American folk music
21st-century music genres
20th-century music genres